The Scottish Constitutional Commission is an independent and non-partisan think-tank, founded in 2005 by John Drummond, Chris Thomson and Canon Kenyon Wright, formerly of the Scottish Constitutional Convention.  The Scottish Constitutional Commission conducts research and advocacy on the establishment of a liberal and democratic Constitution for Scotland based upon the sovereignty of the Scottish people.  

It is not to be confused with the Commission on Scottish Devolution (Calman Commission) which is an official commission established by the Scottish Parliament to review devolution.

See also
Commission on Scottish Devolution
National Conversation
Scottish Constitutional Convention
Constitution for Scotland
Constitution of the United Kingdom
Royal Commission on the Constitution (United Kingdom), also referred to as the Kilbrandon Commission

External links
Scottish Constitutional Commission website

Think tanks established in 2005
2005 in British politics
2005 establishments in Scotland
Politics of Scotland
Scottish Parliament
Scottish devolution
Constitution of the United Kingdom
Constitutional commissions
Think tanks based in Scotland
Scottish commissions and inquiries